Sven Ratke (born 3 January 1972 in Görlitz) is a German former footballer who played as an attacking midfielder.

Career

Ratke began his career with Dynamo Dresden, making his debut in the 1989–90 season, in which the club won the League and Cup double, with Ratke coming on as a substitute for Matthias Döschner in the cup final. After reunification, Dynamo qualified for the Bundesliga, where they played for four seasons, and Ratke played in each one, a total of 48 appearances (one goal). After Dynamo's relegation in 1995, Ratke left the club, joining ambitious Hamburg club SV Lurup, where he spent half a season before signing for VfL Wolfsburg of the 2. Bundesliga. Wolfsburg were promoted to the Bundesliga in Ratke's second season with the club, and he made 13 appearances at this level, before leaving in 1998.

Ratke then returned to Dresden, spending a season in amateur football, with VfB Hellerau-Klotzsche, before signing for Dresdner SC, who were at this point the top club in the city, finishing second in the Regionalliga Nordost, while Dynamo were relegated to the NOFV-Oberliga. In 2002, Dynamo returned to the third tier (now the Regionalliga Nord), and Ratke returned to the club, where he spent two seasons before retiring in 2004, having helped the club earn promotion to the 2. Bundesliga.

References

External links
 Career stats at RSSSF
 

1972 births
Living people
German footballers
East German footballers
Dynamo Dresden players
Dynamo Dresden II players
VfL Wolfsburg players
Dresdner SC players
Dynamo Dresden non-playing staff
People from Görlitz
Bundesliga players
2. Bundesliga players
DDR-Oberliga players
Association football midfielders
Footballers from Saxony